The Bust of Cardinal Melchior Klesl is a life-size marble bust of the seventeenth-century cardinal by Gianlorenzo Bernini and his assistants, notably Giuliano Finelli. It was probably executed in 1626. It is unclear how much of the work was executed by Bernini and how much by Finelli, or indeed others in Bernini's studio. The sculpture is part of Klesl's tomb in the cathedral of Wiener Neustadt, just south of Vienna.

See also
List of works by Gian Lorenzo Bernini

Notes

References

Further reading

External links
 

1620s sculptures
Marble sculptures in Austria
Busts by Gian Lorenzo Bernini
Busts (sculpture)